The 1935–36 Cypriot First Division was the 2nd season of the Cypriot top-level football league.

Overview
It was contested by eight teams, and APOEL won the championship.

League standings

Results

References
Cyprus - List of final tables (RSSSF)

Cypriot First Division seasons
Cypriot
1935–36 in Cypriot football